Chad Akio Morton (born April 4, 1977) is a former American football running back and kick/punt returner in the National Football League.  He was drafted from USC late in the fifth round of the 2000 NFL Draft by the New Orleans Saints. After a standout rookie year with the Saints, Morton played five more years between stints with the New York Jets, the Washington Redskins, and the New York Giants.

Morton was part of the Green Bay Packers coaching staff when the team won the Super Bowl in 2010. He is currently on the Seattle Seahawks' coaching staff as a running backs coach.

High school years
Morton attended South High School in Torrance, California, where he was a letterman in football.

College career
Morton was a running back for the University of Southern California Trojans in the late-1990s. A notable moment in Morton's college football career was in 1999, when he guaranteed a USC victory prior to a game against the UCLA who carried an eight-game winning streak against the Trojans. Morton ran for 143 yards in a USC victory. In 2010, it was named by ESPN as the fourth biggest moment in the USC-UCLA football rivalry.

Professional career
Drafted 166th overall (the fifth round) of the 2000 NFL Draft by the New Orleans Saints, Morton became one of very few rookie running backs in Saints history to get significant playing time (16 games) and make an impact on offense and as a kick returner his first year in the pros. He contributed a career-best receiving year 213 yards on 30 catches (7.1 yards per reception), plus 136 yards rushing, and 1,029 yards from 44 kick returns to the Saints' successful, 10-6 NFC West title-winning 2000 season. Morton's postseason contributions were especially crucial to the 2000 Saints.  Following the New Orleans Saints' first ever playoff win, they hosted the Minnesota Vikings for the divisional round game, and Morton set the record for most receptions in a single playoff game by a rookie while tying the playoff game record for most receptions by a player, with 13 in the ultimately losing effort against the Vikings.

Morton's career-best year at kick returner came with the 2002 New York Jets, as he earned .1,509 yards and two touchdowns (both TDs in a single game) returning kickoffs for Herman Edwards' Jets squad, which won the AFC East title that year and ran away with a blowout win in the first round of the playoffs before falling in the divisional round to the ultimate AFC Championship winners, the Raiders.

He was a first alternate to the 2005 Pro Bowl as a kick returner.

His last year playing football was 2006 with the New York Giants, as he suffered a career-ending ACL tear in Week 16 while covering a punt.  On February 13, 2007, he was released by the Giants.

Morton joined the Green Bay Packers in 2009 as the team’s coaching administrator, and he was promoted to assistant special teams coach in February 2010.  Morton assisted the Pack's 2010 special teams units that ultimately won championship rings in Super Bowl XLV.
With a coaching staff shakeup following the Packers' 2013 season, he left Green Bay.

He is currently with the Seattle Seahawks as a running backs coach.

NFL records
 Most kickoff return touchdowns in a single game: 2 (2002 vs Buffalo Bills) (tied with 9 others)
 Longest overtime kickoff returned for a touchdown: 96 (2002 vs Buffalo Bills)
 Most receptions in a playoff game by a rookie: 13 (2000)
 Most receptions in a playoff game: 13 (2000) (tied with 3 others)

Personal life
Chad Morton is of mixed ethnicity, African American and Japanese. He is married to Tamra Morton. He is the younger brother of  Eric Morton, Dartmouth WR   and wide receiver Johnnie Morton.

References

1977 births
Living people
American football return specialists
American football running backs
Green Bay Packers coaches
New Orleans Saints players
New York Giants players
New York Jets players
Seattle Seahawks coaches
USC Trojans football players
Washington Redskins players
Players of American football from Torrance, California
African-American players of American football
American sportspeople of Japanese descent
21st-century African-American sportspeople
20th-century African-American sportspeople